ATL-444 is a drug which acts as a potent and reasonably selective antagonist for the adenosine receptors A1 and A2A. It has been used to study the role of the adenosine receptor system in the reinforcing action of cocaine, as well as the development of some cancers.

See also 
 CGS-15943

References 

Adenosine receptor antagonists
Cyclohexanols
Tertiary alcohols